Somphote Ahunai is a Thai billionaire. He made his fortune from his founding of the renewable energy firm Energy Absolute. He has overseen the expansion of the firm into the electric car (Mine Mobility) and a gigafactory. He graduated from the Joseph M. Katz Graduate School of Business, and began his career in security trading. He resides primarily in Bangkok. His firm has been likened to the "Tesla of Asia."

References

Somphote Ahunai
Joseph M. Katz Graduate School of Business alumni
Somphote Ahunai
Living people
Year of birth missing (living people)
Place of birth missing (living people)